AnyDoc Software, founded in 1989 as Microsystems Technology, Inc., was a company based in Tampa, Florida that developed, sold, installed, and supported enterprise content management (ECM) software which captures data from scanned documents or images into machine-readable text (and images) for back-office applications and content/document management systems. The company’s flagship product, OCR for Forms (which was later renamed OCR for AnyDoc) debuted in 1991 after two years of product research and development. AnyDoc Software was purchased in 2013 by Hyland Software, which is best known for its document management and content services software, OnBase. AnyDoc users can find more information about their products on the AnyDoc Community Page.

AnyDoc developed technologies to process structured, semi-structured, and unstructured (free-form) documents, as well as classification, and workflow. Structured documents, where data appears in the same location on each form (such as a credit application or order form), use template-based technology. A template in essence, is a map telling the software where the data is located on the document and how to process that data. While template-based data capture is still widely used to eliminate the manual data entry previously required to process structured documents, it is not a feasible solution to efficiently process semi-structured documents, such as invoices, remittances, and checks. AnyDoc developed AnyApp technology to capture the data for these more complex documents and to memorize the data locations for subsequent encounters with the same document types for expedited processing.

History
1989: Company founded.
1991: Flagship product, OCR for Forms (now known as OCR for AnyDoc) introduced.
1999: European headquarters opened in Zug, Switzerland.
2001: Semi-structured forms processing technology AnyApp introduced.
2003: Company name changed to AnyDoc Software and rebranding of products.
2006: Opened UK satellite office in Hampshire, United Kingdom.
2007: Introduction of capture workflow product, Infiniworx to auto-classify documents in a company’s workflow.
2008: Opened German office in Wiesbaden, Germany.
2013: Acquired by Hyland Software, Inc.

References

External links

Software companies based in Florida
Companies based in Tampa, Florida
1989 establishments in Florida
Defunct software companies of the United States